Martyr Yasser Arafat Governmental Hospital or Salfit Governmental Hospital is a government hospital in the Salfit city, West Bank, Palestine. Followed by the Palestinian Ministry of Health. It was built in 2006 and has 50 medical beds. It employs 200 staff, including a doctor, nurse, pharmacist, physiotherapist, laboratory technician, radiologist and others.

References

Hospitals in the State of Palestine

Buildings and structures in Salfit